Poor Prince is a Taiwanese television series starring Vic Chou, Ken Chu, Annie Yi, Edward Ou and Will Liu. It is based on Japanese manga series,  written by Ai Morinaga. It was produced by Comic Ritz International Production and Angie Chai as producer. It was broadcast in Taiwan on free-to-air Chinese Television System (CTS) from 11 August 2001.

Synopsis
Tai Lang (Taro) is the smart, capable, and good at everything. He is popular with girls at school not just due to his qualities but also because of rumors that his family is the richest of the rich families at his school. But the truth is, Tai Lang lives in a poor one-room home with his mother and six siblings, scraping for every single cent and his skills come only from being the man and woman of the house. Unintentionally hiding his poverty, Taro is a kind person which makes him all the more lovable. When Long Zi falls for his exterior, she tries to seduce him to get out of the low-middle-class life she is living until she discovers the truth about his "riches"...

Cast
 Vic Chou as Tai Lang
 Gao Hao Jun as Yu Chen
 Li Jin Hong as San Pu
 Ken Chu as He Fu
 Annie Yi as Ling Zi
 Sandrine Pinna as Si Mei
 Liu Han Ya as Long Zi
 Stella Chang as Niao Ju
 Wu Ti Ni as Mei Jia
 Lin You Wei as Ah Tian
 Edward Ou as Ci Lang
 Kimi Hsia as Mei Sui
 Ivy Yin as Mei-yao
 Jian Pei En
 Ge Wei Ru
 Will Liu
 Yang Ya Zhu
 Eric Chen

Music
 Opening theme song: "I Want to Hold Your Hand" by Dragon 5
 Ending theme song: "你是我的幸福嗎" (Ni Shi Wo De Xing Fu Ma) [Are You My Happiness?] by Annie Yi

External links
Spcnet.tv Review

Taiwanese drama television series
Chinese Television System original programming
2001 Taiwanese television series debuts
2001 Taiwanese television series endings
Taiwanese television dramas based on manga